Beth Van Hoesen (1926 – November 26, 2010), sometimes known as Beth Van Hoesen Adams, was an American artist who was best known for her prints and drawings of animals and botanical subjects.

Biography
Elizabeth "Beth" Marie Van Hoesen was born in Boise, Idaho, the daughter of Enderse Van Hoesen and Freda Van Hoesen.  She earned a B.A. degree from Stanford University in 1948.  After graduation, she continued her studies in France at the Ecole des Beaux Arts de Fontainbleau (1948), the Académie Julian (1948 to 1950), and the Académie de la Grande Chaumière (1948 to 1950).  In 1951, she enrolled at the California School of Fine Arts, where she studied under the painters David Park and Clyfford Still.

Although Van Hoesen is best known for her animal portraits, her other subjects ranged from people to landscapes, still lives, and botanical subjects. She worked mainly in print media, especially etching, using drawings extensively for preparatory work. Her style is lively and playful, with attention to the telling detail. In the 1970s, she was diagnosed with depression; it severely affected her ability to draw for a time, and she began to keep a diary, which was published in 1975.

During her lifetime she exhibited at museums and galleries across the United States. In the early 1980s, a traveling exhibition of her work was organized by the Art Museum Association; it toured the United States for three years. Another touring exhibition took place the year of her death. Her work won a number of awards, including a 1981 Award of Honor in Graphics from the San Francisco Arts Commission, and a 1993 Distinguished Artist Award from the California Society of Printmakers.

Public collections holding her work include the New York Museum of Modern Art, the Art Institute of Chicago, the Brooklyn Museum, the Butler Institute of American Art, the Cincinnati Art Museum, the El Paso Museum of Art, the Fine Arts Museums of San Francisco, the Weisman Art Museum, Honolulu Museum of Art, the Oakland Museum of California, the Nelson-Atkins Museum of Art, and the Victoria and Albert Museum in London.

The artist's print archive was given to the Portland Art Museum.

A catalogue raisonné of her work was issued in 2011.

Personal life
In 1953, she married fellow artist Mark Adams. At their home in San Francisco's Castro neighborhood, where she lived for nearly 50 years, Van Hoesen and Adams hosted a weekly drawing group attended by artists such as Wayne Thiebaud and Theophilus Brown.

References

Further reading
 Goldyne, Joseph, and Bob Hicks. Beth Van Hoesen: The Observant Eye. Fresno Art Museum, 2009 
 Hicks, Bob. Beth Van Hoesen: Catalogue Raisonne of Limited-Edition Prints, Books, and Portfolios. Hudson Hills Press,  2011 
 Johnson, Robert Flynn. Beth Van Hoesen: Paintings, Drawings and Prints. De Saisset Museum, University of Santa Clara, Santa Clara, California, 1983
 Van Hoesen, Beth. A Collection of Wonderful Things: Intaglio Prints by Beth Van Hoesen. Scrimshaw Press, San Francisco, 1972
 Van Hoesen, Beth. Creatures: The Art of Seeing Animals. Yolla Bolly Press Book, San Francisco, 1987 
 Van Hoesen, Beth. Works on Paper. Chronicle Books, 1996 
 Van Hoesen, Beth. Selections from the Nude Man: 12 Intaglio Prints by Beth Van Hoesen. Crown Point Press, Oakland, 1965
 Van Hoesen, Beth. "Self-Portraits During My Illness". 1975
 Van Hoesen, Beth, and Bob Hicks. Fauna and Flora. Pomegranate Communications, 2014.

External links
"Oral history interview with Mark Adams and Beth Van Hoesen, 1983 August 31-1984 February 24": interview at the Archives of American Art

20th-century American painters
Modern painters
American contemporary painters
1926 births
2010 deaths
People from Boise, Idaho
Stanford University alumni
San Francisco Art Institute alumni
Académie Julian alumni
20th-century American women artists
American women printmakers
20th-century American printmakers
21st-century American women
Artists from San Francisco